Lion Lauberbach (born 15 February 1998) is a German professional footballer who plays as an centre-forward or left winger for Eintracht Braunschweig.

Career
In June 2019, it was announced Lauberbach would join 2. Bundesliga side Holstein Kiel from FSV Zwickau for an undisclosed transfer fee having agreed a three-year contract.

He moved to on loan to until the end half of 2020–21 season in January 2020.

References

1998 births
Living people
Sportspeople from Erfurt
German footballers
Association football forwards
Association football wingers
2. Bundesliga players
3. Liga players
FC Rot-Weiß Erfurt players
FSV Zwickau players
Holstein Kiel players
FC Hansa Rostock players
Eintracht Braunschweig players